Lam Dom Noi is a tributary of the Mun River. It originates in the Dongrek mountains and flows northwards. The watercourse passes Buntharik District and is stopped by the Sirindhorn Dam in Chong Mek Subdistrict, Sirindhorn District.

The Sirindhorn reservoir is the biggest water resource of Ubon Ratchathani Province.

Dom Noi
Geography of Ubon Ratchathani province